Symsagittifera is a genus of worms belonging to the family Convolutidae.

The species of this genus are found in West Europe and South Africa.

Species:

Symsagittifera bifoveolata 
Symsagittifera corsicae 
Symsagittifera japonica 
Symsagittifera macnaei 
Symsagittifera nitidae 
Symsagittifera poenicea 
Symsagittifera psammophila 
Symsagittifera roscoffensis 
Symsagittifera schultzei 
Symsagittifera smaragdina

References

Acoelomorphs